The 7th Asian Games were held from 1 to 16 September 1974 in Tehran, Imperial State of Iran. The Aryamehr Sports Complex was built for the Games. The Asian Games were hosted in the Middle East for the first time. Tehran, the capital of Iran, played host to 3,010 athletes coming from 25 countries/NOCs, the highest number of participants since the inception of the Games.

Fencing, gymnastics and women's basketball were added to the existing disciplines. The games were known for the use of state-of-the-art technology, from synthetic track to photo-finish cameras.

History
Starting in 1962, the Games were hit by several crises. First, the host country Indonesia, refused to permit the participation of Israel and the Republic of China (Taiwan) due to political and religious issues. As a result, the IOC removed its sponsorship of the Games and terminated Indonesia as one of the IOC members. The Asian Football Confederation (AFC), International Association of Athletics Federations (IAAF) and International Weightlifting Federation (IWF), also removed their recognition of the Games.

In 1970, South Korea dropped its plan to host the Games due to national security crisis; however, the main reason was the financial crisis, forcing the previous host Thailand to administer the Games again in Bangkok using funds transferred from South Korea. Prior to the Games, Japan was asked to host the Games, but declined due to Expo '70 in Osaka. This edition also marked the first time the Games were broadcast on television throughout the world.

Track and field was one of the most popular disciplines of these games in 1974 in Tehran. Some of the famous figures of this discipline at that time in the men's category were Manouchehr Shamshiri, the Iranian track and field champion in 110 meters hurdles, 100 meters and 800 meters, Reza Entezari, 400 meters and 800 meters hurdles champion, Ahmad Goodarzi, 3000 meters hurdles champion.

Host city selection

 
On 11 and 12 January 1968, a meeting was organised at the Bangkok, in between the representatives of nine Asian National Olympic Committees. The framework of the meeting was set up in another meeting held on 1 September 1970 during Bangkok Asian Games. Tehran was selected as host city after defeating Kuwait City and Tel Aviv.

Organisation
The responsibility of organising the Seventh Asian Games was assigned to a special committee headed by the Amir Abbas Hoveida, then Prime Minister of Iran.

Venues

The venue for the 1974 Asian Games was the multi-purpose sport complex– Aryamehr Sports Complex.

The stadium was designed by Abdolaziz Farmanfarmaian and rupees 100,000 persons were required for the full construction, which was completed on 1  April 1971. The stadium was named to Aryamehr, meaning the light of Aryans referring to Mohammad Reza Shah Pahlavi, then king of Iran.

 Aryamehr Sport Complex – Aquatics, Athletics, Basketball, Cycling, Fencing, Gymnastics, Field hockey, Football, Volleyball, Shooting, Table tennis, Weightlifting and Wrestling
 Amjadieh Sport Complex – Badminton and Football
 Mohammad Reza Shah Stadium – Boxing
 Shahanshahi Club – Shooting
 Apadana Stadium – Football

The Games

Opening ceremony

On 1 September 1974, the Seventh Asian Games were officially opened. The list of the guests included— Shah of Iran Mohammad-Reza Pahlavi, then Prime Minister of Iran Amir Abbas Hoveida, cabinet members of Iranian Government, President of Israel Ephraim Katzir, President of South Korea Park Chung-hee, King of Thailand Bhumibol Adulyadej, diplomatic corps and representatives of participating Asian NOCs. The Aryamehr Stadium was filled with an estimated 100,000 spectators. After a speech by the president of Asian Games Federation, HRH Yadavendra Singh, Mohammad Reza Shah officially opened the Games. The ceremony featured a card stunt performed by students of Chulalongkorn University in Thailand.

Sports

Participating nations
The Asian Games Federation conference, which was held ten months before the Games, decided to expel the Republic of China (Taiwan) from the games and accepted the entry of the People's Republic of China. The Arab nations, Pakistan, China and North Korea refused to play with Israel in tennis, fencing, basketball and football. This was the last time Israel competed in the Asian Games.

Calendar
In the following calendar for the 1974 Asian Games, each blue box represents an event competition, such as a qualification round, on that day. The yellow boxes represent days during which medal-awarding finals for a sport were held. The numeral indicates the number of event finals for each sport held that day. On the left, the calendar lists each sport with events held during the Games, and at the right, how many gold medals were won in that sport. There is a key at the top of the calendar to aid the reader.

Medal table

The top ten ranked NOCs at these Games are listed below. The host nation, Iran, is highlighted.

See also

1976 AFC Asian Cup

References

External links

 www.ocasia.org
 "Champions of Asia" Anthem of 1974 Asian Games in Tehran (Video)

 
Asian Games
Asian Games
Multi-sport events in Iran
Asian Games by year
Asian Games
Sport in Tehran
Asian Games
20th century in Tehran
September 1974 sports events in Asia